Santiago González and Aisam-ul-Haq Qureshi were the defending champions but chose not to defend their title.

Matt Reid and Ken Skupski won the title after defeating Matthew Ebden and John-Patrick Smith 4–6, 7–5, [10–6] in the final.

Seeds

Draw

References

External links 
 Main draw

Nottingham Open - Men's Doubles
Men's Doubles